Agrotis munda, the brown cutworm or pink cutworm, is a noctuid moth. It is endemic to Australia. It is present in New Zealand.

References

External links 

 Herbison-Evans, Don; Crossley, Stella (2006) Agrotis munda

Agrotis
Agricultural pest insects
Moths described in 1857
Moths of Australia
Moths of New Zealand